Alvaro Galan Floria (born January 28, 1977, in Madrid) is a boccia player from Spain.  He has a physical disability: He has cerebral palsy and is a BC2 type athlete. He competed at the 2000 Summer Paralympics.  He was on the BC1/BC2	team from Spain.  His team finished second.  In the first - second finish game, South Korea finished first by a score of 7–6.

References 

Spanish boccia players
Living people
1977 births
Paralympic silver medalists for Spain
Boccia players at the 2000 Summer Paralympics
Sportspeople from Madrid
Paralympic boccia players of Spain
Paralympic medalists in boccia
Medalists at the 2000 Summer Paralympics